Ntinos Pontikas (born 27 February 1982) is a Greek former footballer who played as a striker. He holds the record for the youngest player ever to score a hat-trick.

Record 
On 21 September 1996, Pontikas became the youngest player ever to score a hat-trick at 14 years and 198 days. On his debut match with Haravgi he scored his team's all 3 goals, in their away 4–3 defeat to Ampelokipoi, in the fifth tier of the Greek championship. Opponents Ampelokipoi's squad in that match featured 1988 Greek champion Giorgos Kolovos, 1985 Cup winner and team captain Babis Ntosas, (both as AEL players), and also future Greece international defender Vangelis Moras, as an unused substitute.

Pontikas recorded jaw-dropping scoring performances on two more occasions, but in friendly youth games. The first was in 1995 when he scored 13 goals, aged 13 and the second in 1997 with the youngster hitting the net 10 times. He also holds the national record for the youngest player to feature in a U-18 high school county league final, at 14 years and 9 months.

Biography 
Pontikas started off with street football before having a brief spell at Toxotis Larissa's youth section in 1995 where Theofanis Gekas was also playing at the time. He subsequently joined Haravgi and was immediately promoted to the first team, scoring a hat-trick on his debut at the age of 14. A few years later he was forced to quit football at a young age due to a serious injury. 

Pontikas who was considered one of the most promising young strikers was also one of the fastest players of his generation being able to run 100 metres in less than 11 seconds.

After his forced retirement he attempted to return to football twice by signing and training with local Greek clubs, without featuring in any official match. He eventually joined the English Sunday League at the age of 38, playing a full 90 minutes on his debut.

See also 
List of world association football records
List of footballers who achieved hat-trick records

References

External links
 RSSSF Greece 1996–97 on RSSSF

1982 births
Living people
Footballers from Larissa
Greek footballers
Association football forwards